Hartmut Ostrowski (born 25 February 1958 in Bielefeld) was CEO of Bertelsmann AG from 1 January 2008 until 31 December 2011, succeeding Gunter Thielen.

Ostrowski studied business administration at Bielefeld University and joined Bertelsmann AG in 1982.
From 1 September 2002 until December 2007, Ostrowski was CEO of Arvato AG, an international media and communication service provider, a 100% subsidiary of Bertelsmann AG.

Ostrowski is married and has two children.

References

External links
"Interview with Hartmut Ostrowski 175 years of Bertelsmann"
"Interview with Bertelsmann CEO Hartmut Ostrowski", Spiegel Online, 07/09/2008

1958 births
Living people
Bertelsmann
German chief executives
Businesspeople from Bielefeld